A generative actor is an instigator of social change. They promote cultural change by defying cultural normatives. Noted examples include Galileo and Rosa Parks.

See also
 Structuration theory

Sociological terminology